Patince is the southernmost village and municipality in Slovakia, in the Komárno District in the Nitra Region of south-west Slovakia.

Geography
The village lies at an altitude of 111 metres and covers an area of 11.306 km2.
It has a population of about 450 people.

History
In the 9th century, the territory of Patince became part of the Kingdom of Hungary. In historical records the village was first mentioned in 1260.
After the Austro-Hungarian army disintegrated in November 1918, Czechoslovak troops occupied the area, later acknowledged internationally by the Treaty of Trianon. Between 1938 and 1945 Patince once more  became part of Miklós Horthy's Hungary through the First Vienna Award. From 1945 until the Velvet Divorce, it was part of Czechoslovakia. Since then it has been part of Slovakia.

Sights 

 St. Vendel Roman Catholic Church - The single-nave church, originally built of stone in the 13th century. It was renovated in the first third of the 18th century and rebuilt in 1776 in Baroque style. There were minor reconstructions of the church in the mid-19th century, early 20th century, and after the 1965 flood. The church was reconstructed in 2002. The patron saint of our church is St. Vendel, who is the patron saint of shepherds, cattle breeders and farmers.
 The Monument to the victims of World War I. and II. - Their names - along with those who fell in World War I - are preserved in the marble slabs of the monument to the heroes. The statue stands on the school grounds, made in 1940 by the Hungarian János Holdamf, a stonemason from Süttő.
The Monument to the victims of World War I. - It was commemorated by the village of Patince with the support of the Bethlen Gábor Foundation in 2018, in memory of the residents who died in the World War I.
 Lourdes Cave - It was built in 1933, with the following prayer inscription: “Virgin Mary, dear lily thread, pray for us at your precious holy son. With a trembling heart, we sigh at you: "Break the rope of sin from us!"
 Water pumping steam station: next to the Danube dam is the unique technical monument built in 1897, with an engine house in its original condition. The components of the steam engine station include a pump, a separate chimney, a coal storage and an engine room.
 Flood monument: From 1965, it stands where in Path broke through the dam.

Actively 

 Sightseeing tour by boat - The Patince port is situated at the 1,752 kilometre point of the river in beautiful natural scenery. The port provides sightseeing cruises around Patince. 
 Spa Patince - The termal water in Patince was already used by the Romans for healing, but there is a record of it from the Middle Ages too. In the 18th century Mathias Bel in his large geographical work, NotitiaHungariae ... describes the healing power of the water, and constantly they used it later on, mostly for treatment of pain in extremity.
 Wellness Hotel Patince**** - is an oasis of peace and harmony serving as an escape from the stress of the surrounding world.
Eurovelo 6 - Bicycle tour from Komárno to Kravany nad Dunajom between Patince.

Ethnicity
According to the 2021 census, out of 527 inhabitants there were 414 (78,56 %) Hungarians, 85 (16,13 %) Slovaks and 28 (5,31 %) others.

Facilities
The village has a public library a swimming pool and a  football pitch.

Partner towns
  Borsodszentgyörgy, Hungary
Source: Együttműködési megállapodás

References

External links
https://www.visitdanube.eu/en/actively-6
https://web.archive.org/web/20080208225314/http://www.statistics.sk/mosmis/eng/run.html

Villages and municipalities in the Komárno District
Hungarian communities in Slovakia
Populated places on the Danube